The Franconian Jura (or ) is an upland in Franconia, Bavaria, Germany.

Large portions of the Franconian Jura are part of the Altmühl Valley Nature Park. The scenic meanders and gorges formed by the river Altmühl draw tourists to visit the region.

Geologically, the Franconian Jura is the eastern continuation of the Swabian Jura. The mountain chains are separated from each other by the impact crater of the Nördlinger Ries.

The northern part of the Franconian Jura is known as Little Switzerland.

References 

 
Central Uplands
Geography of Bavaria
Mountain ranges of Bavaria
Mountain ranges of Germany